is an action role-playing game for the Game Boy Advance. It is part of the Shining series. Shining Soul is a reboot of the Shining series. The game was followed by a sequel, Shining Soul II, in 2003. Both games were re-released in Japan in early 2006 as part of the Game Boy Advance "Value Selection."

Plot
The game takes place in the land of Rune, where a creature named Dark Dragon has gathered an army of Darkness in an attempt to bring about the destruction of the world. Your character is a hero of the Shining Fleet, which has trapped Dark Dragon and its five generals in the region of Runefaust and is now preparing to make a final assault on the enemy forces.

Gameplay
The game contains four main classes (Warrior, Archer, Dragonute, or Wizard) and several dungeons that involve hack and slash style fighting. The player can cycle between magic and weapons based attacks. As you progress through the game and gain levels, you're able to allocate points for your main stats, like strength and dexterity, as well as distribute skill points. Skill points allow you to raise weapon and magic proficiency levels and to raise the levels of other abilities that are class-specific, such as defense for the warrior, critical hits for the archer, and so on.

Release
The game saw a European release in March 2003, with Infogrames handling distribution and Sega Europe handling publication. In December 2002, THQ, who held a deal with Sega at the time to publish their games on the Game Boy Advance in the market, announced they had no intentions on releasing the title in the region.

Reception

The game received "mixed" reviews according to the review aggregation website Metacritic. In Japan, Famitsu gave it a score of 30 out of 40. 

Craig Harris of IGN lamented, "As it stands, Shining Soul just feels like a shell of a design, good ideas and intentions spattered throughout boring action sequences."

Tom Bramwell of Eurogamer said: "It says "RPG" in the genre box, but it's really not. Role-playing games are renowned for their engaging (or at least expansive) plot lines, diverse characters and locations, progressive combat and intricacy. Shining Soul is notable because it singularly fails to live up to anything that's come before it."

Notes

References

External links

2002 video games
Action role-playing video games
Atlus games
Game Boy Advance games
Game Boy Advance-only games
Grasshopper Manufacture games
Multiplayer and single-player video games
Nex Entertainment games
Role-playing video games
Shining (series)
Video games developed in Japan
Video games with isometric graphics